Sophonias may refer to:

 Sophonias (fl. c. 600 BC), Greco-Latin form of the name of the Hebrew religious leader, Zephaniah
 Sophonias (commentator) (fl. c. 1300), commentator on Aristotle